Arcade Fire is a Canadian indie rock band from Montreal, Quebec. The band was formed by the husband and wife duo of Win Butler and Régine Chassagne in 2003, and released its first studio album Funeral on Merge Records in September 2004. The album produced five singles: "Neighborhood #1 (Tunnels)" (2004), "Neighborhood #2 (Laïka)" (2005), "Neighborhood #3 (Power Out)" (2005), "Rebellion (Lies)" (2005), and "Wake Up" (2005). Funeral earned the band a nomination at the 48th Annual Grammy Awards. The album has sold over 320,000 copies in the United States and over 100,000 copies in Canada. Funeral peaked at number 23 in Canada and number 131 in the United States.

The band's second album, Neon Bible, was released on March 5, 2007 to favourable reviews. The album produced four singles: "Black Mirror" (2007), "Keep the Car Running" (2007), "Intervention" (2007), and "No Cars Go" (2007). Neon Bible was nominated at the 2008 Grammy Award for Best Alternative Music Album, and it won the Juno Award for Alternative Album of the Year. The album also sold 142,000 copies as of May 2008, peaking at number one in Canada and number two in the United States. Arcade Fire has received five awards from 21 nominations, including two Juno Awards from six nominations, one Meteor Music Awards from three nominations, and two PLUG Independent Music Awards from three nominations.

Antville Music Video Awards
The Antville Music Video Awards are online awards for the best music video and music video directors of the year. They were first awarded in 2005. Arcade Fire has received seven nominations.

|-
| rowspan="2" | 2005 || rowspan="2" | "Neighborhood #3 (Power Out)" || Worst Video || 
|-
| Best Video || 
|-
| 2007 || "My Body Is a Cage" || Best Editing || 
|-
| rowspan="4" | 2013 || rowspan="2" | "Afterlife" || Best Performance || 
|-
| Best Choreography || 
|-
| "Reflektor" || Best Interactive Video || 
|-
| Arcade Fire || Best Commissioning Artist || 
|}

Brit Awards
The Brit Awards are the British Phonographic Industry's annual pop music awards. Arcade Fire has received eight nominations and two won.

|-
| align="center" rowspan="3" | 2006 || Funeral || International Album || 
|-
| rowspan="2" | Arcade Fire || International Breakthrough Act || 
|-
| International Group || 
|-
| align="center" rowspan="2" | 2008 || Neon Bible || International Album || 
|-
| Arcade Fire || International Group || 
|-
| align="center" rowspan="2" | 2011 || The Suburbs || International Album || 
|-
| Arcade Fire || International Group || 
|-
| align="center" | 2014 || Arcade Fire || International Group || 
|-
| align="center" | 2018 || Arcade Fire || International Group || 
|}

CASBY Awards
The CASBY Awards are a Canadian awards ceremony for independent and alternative music, presented annually by Toronto, Ontario radio station CFNY-FM, currently branded as 102.1 The Edge. CASBY is an acronym for Canadian Artists Selected By You.

|-
| align="center" rowspan="2" | 2005 || Funeral || Favorite New Album || 
|-
| Arcade Fire || Favorite New Artist || 
|}

GAFFA Awards

Denmark GAFFA Awards
Delivered since 1991, the GAFFA Awards are a Danish award that rewards popular music by the magazine of the same name.

!
|-
| rowspan="2"| 2007
| Neon Bible
| Best Foreign Album
| 
| style="text-align:center;" rowspan="2"|
|-
| Arcada Fire
| Best Foreign Band
| 
|-
|}

Sweden GAFFA Awards
Delivered since 2010, the GAFFA Awards (Swedish: GAFFA Priset) are a Swedish award that rewards popular music awarded by the magazine of the same name.

!
|-
| 2018
| "Everything Now"
| Best Foreign Song
| 
| style="text-align:center;" |
|-
|}

Grammy Awards
The Grammy Awards are awarded annually by The Recording Academy of the United States. Arcade Fire has received ten nominations and has won once.

|-
| align="center" rowspan="2" | 2006 || "Cold Wind"  || Best Song Written for Visual Media || 
|-
| Funeral || rowspan="2"|Best Alternative Music Album || 
|-
| align="center" | 2008 || Neon Bible || 
|-
| align="center" rowspan="3" | 2011 || "Ready to Start" || Best Rock Performance by a Duo or Group with Vocal || 
|-
| rowspan="2" | The Suburbs || Album of the Year || 
|-
| Best Alternative Music Album || 
|-
| align="center" | 2013 || "Abraham's Daughter"  || Best Song Written for Visual Media || 
|-
| align="center" rowspan="2" | 2015 || "We Exist" || Best Music Video  || 
|-
| Reflektor || rowspan="3"|Best Alternative Music Album || 
|-
| align="center" | 2018 || Everything Now || 
|-
| align="center" | 2023 || WE || 
|-
|}

iHeartRadio Much Music Video Awards
The iHeartRadio Much Music Video Awards are annual awards presented by the Canadian television channel Much to honour the year's best music video. Arcade Fire has won one award from twelve nominations.

|-
| align="center" | 2005 || "Rebellion (Lies)" || Best Independent Video || 
|-
| align="center" | 2006 || "Neighborhood #3 (Power Out)" || Best Post-Production || 
|-
| align="center" rowspan="2" | 2011 || rowspan="2" | "The Suburbs" || International Video of the Year by a Canadian || 
|-
| UR Fave: Artist || 
|-
| align="center" | 2012 || "Sprawl II (Mountains Beyond Mountains)" || MuchFACT Indie Video of the Year || 
|-
| align="center" rowspan="4" | 2014 || rowspan="2" | "Afterlife" || Video of the Year || 
|-
| Director of the Year  || 
|-
| rowspan="2" | "Reflektor" || Rock/Alternative Video of the Year || 
|-
| Your Fave Video || 
|-
| align="center" rowspan="3" | 2015 || rowspan="3" | "We Exist" || Video of the Year || 
|-
| Best Director  || 
|-
| Best Rock/Alternative Video || 
|-
| align="center" rowspan="3" | 2018 || Arcade Fire || Best Rock/Alternative Artist or Group || 
|}

Juno Award
The Juno Award are presented by the Canadian Academy of Recording Arts and Sciences. Arcade Fire has won ten awards from eighteen nominations.

|-
| align="center" rowspan="2" | 2005 || rowspan="2" | Funeral || Alternative Album of the Year || 
|-
| Best Album Design || 
|-
| align="center" rowspan="2" | 2006 || "Neighborhood #3 (Power Out)" || Video of the Year || 
|-
| Arcade Fire || Songwriter of the Year || 
|-
| align="center" rowspan="4" | 2008 || rowspan="3" | Neon Bible || Video of the Year || 
|-
| Alternative Album of the Year || 
|-
| CD/DVD Artwork Design of the Year || 
|-
| Arcade Fire || Group of the Year || 
|-
| align="center" rowspan="5" | 2011 || rowspan="2" | The Suburbs || Album of the Year || 
|-
| Alternative Album of the Year || 
|-
| rowspan="3" | Arcade Fire || Group of the Year || 
|-
| Songwriter of the Year || 
|-
| Jack Richardson Producer of the Year || 
|-
| align="center" rowspan="6" | 2014 || rowspan="2" | Reflektor || Album of the Year || 
|-
| Alternative Album of the Year || 
|-
| "Reflektor" || Single of the Year || 
|-
| rowspan="3" | Arcade Fire || Group of the Year || 
|-
| Songwriter of the Year || 
|-
| Fan Choice Award || 
|-
| align="center" | 2016 || Arcade Fire || Allan Waters Humanitarian Award || 
|-
| align="center" rowspan="5" | 2018 || rowspan="3" | Everything Now || Album of the Year || 
|-
| Alternative Album of the Year || 
|-
| Album Artwork of the Year || 
|-
| "Everything Now" || Single of the Year || 
|-
| Arcade Fire || Group of the Year || 
|}

Songwriter of the Year
 2006: "Neighborhood #3 (Power Out)", "Wake Up" and "Rebellion (Lies)"
 2011: "Ready to Start", "We Used to Wait" and "Sprawl II (Mountains Beyond Mountains)"
 2014: "Reflektor", "Here Comes the Night Time" and "Afterlife"

Video of the Year
 2006: "Neighborhood #3 (Power Out)" (Producer: Plates Animation)
 2008: Neon Bible (Producer: Vincent Morriset)

CD/DVD Artwork Design of the Year
 2008: Neon Bible (Album Design and Graphics: Tracy Maurice and François Miron)

Meteor Music Awards
The Meteor Music Awards are distributed by MCD Productions. Arcade Fire has won one award from five nominations.

|-
| align="center" rowspan="2" | 2006 || Funeral || Best International Album || 
|-
| Arcade Fire || Best International Band || 
|-
| align="center" rowspan="3" | 2008 || Neon Bible || Best International Album || 
|-
| rowspan="2" | Arcade Fire || Best International Band || 
|-
| Best International Live Performance || 
|}

Mojo Awards
The Mojo Awards was an awards ceremony that began in 2004 and ended in 2010 by Mojo, a popular music magazine published monthly by Bauer Media Group in the United Kingdom. Arcade Fire has won one award from two nominations.

|-
| align="center" | 2005 || Arcade Fire || Best New Act || 
|-
| align="center" | 2007 || Arcade Fire || Best Live Act || 
|}

MTV Europe Music Award
The MTV Europe Music Award is an event presented by Viacom International Media Networks Europe which awards prizes to musicians and performers. Arcade Fire nominated seven awards.

|-
| align="center" | 2010 || Arcade Fire || Best Alternative || 
|-
| align="center" rowspan="2" | 2011 || rowspan="2" | Arcade Fire || Best Alternative || 
|-
| Best World Stage Performance || 
|-
| align="center" | 2012 || Arcade Fire || Best World Stage Performance || 
|-
| align="center" rowspan="2" | 2014 || "We Exist" || Best Song with a Social Message || 
|-
| Arcade Fire || Best Canadian Act || 
|-
| align="center" | 2018 || Arcade Fire || Best Canadian Act || 
|}

MTV Video Music Award
The MTV Video Music Award is an award presented by the cable channel MTV to honor the best in the music video medium. Arcade Fire has won one award from two nominations.

|-
| align="center" rowspan="2" | 2014 || "Reflektor" || Best Art Direction  || 
|-
| "Afterlife" || Best Cinematography  || 
|}

MTVU Woodie Awards
The MTVU Woodie Awards is an annual music show presented by MTVU with awards voted on by fans.

|-
| rowspan="4" | 2005 || "Neighborhood #3 (Power Out)" || Best Video Woodie - Animated || 
|-
| rowspan="3" | Arcade Fire || Woodie of the Year || 
|-
| Left Field Woodie || 
|-
| International Woodie || 
|-
| 2011 || "The Suburbs" || Woodie of the Year || 
|-
| rowspan="3" | 2014 || "Afterlife" || Best Video Woodie || 
|-
| rowspan="2" | Arcade Fire || Performing Woodie || 
|-
| Did It My Way Woodie || 
|}

NME Awards
The NME Awards are an annual music awards show, founded by the music magazine NME. Arcade Fire has been nominated 15 times, and won 3 awards.

|-
| align="center" | 2006 || Arcade Fire || Best International Band || 
|-
| align="center" | 2008 || Arcade Fire || Best International Band || 
|-
| align="center" rowspan="4" | 2008 || Neon Bible || Best International Alternative/Indie Album || 
|-
| "Intervention" || Best International Alternative/Indie Track || 
|-
| rowspan="2" | Arcade Fire || Best International Alternative/Indie Band || 
|-
| Best International Alternative/Indie Live Act || 
|-
| align="center" rowspan="4" | 2011 || The Suburbs || Best Album || 
|-
| "We Used to Wait" || Best Music Video || 
|-
| rowspan="2" | Arcade Fire || Best International Band || 
|-
| Best Live Band || 
|-
| align="center" | 2012 || Arcade Fire || Best International Band || 
|-
| align="center" rowspan="3" | 2014 || rowspan="2" | "Reflektor" || Best Music Video || 
|-
| Best Track || 
|-
| Arcade Fire || Best International Band || 
|-
| align="center" | 2015 || Arcade Fire || Best International Band || 
|}

PLUG Independent Music Awards
The PLUG Independent Music Awards are given in support of independent musician. Arcade Fire has won five awards from ten nominations.

|-
| align="center" rowspan="3" | 2005 || rowspan="2" | Funeral || Indie Rock Album of the Year || 
|-
| Album Art/Packaging of the Year || 
|-
| Arcade Fire || New Artist of the Year || 
|-
| align="center" | 2006 || Arcade Fire || Live Act of the Year || 
|-
| align="center" rowspan="6" | 2008 || rowspan="3" | Neon Bible || Album of the Year || 
|-
| Indie Rock Album of the Year || 
|-
| Album Art/Packaging of the Year || 
|-
| "Keep the Car Running" || Song of the Year || 
|-
| rowspan="2" | Arcade Fire || Artist of the Year || 
|-
| Live Act of the Year || 
|}

Polaris Music Prize
The Polaris Music Prize is awarded annually to the best full-length Canadian album based on artistic merit. Arcade Fire has won two award from five nominations.

|-
| align="center" | 2007 || Neon Bible || Polaris Music Prize || 
|-
| align="center" | 2011 || The Suburbs || Polaris Music Prize || 
|-
| align="center" | 2014 || Reflektor || Polaris Music Prize || 
|-
| align="center" | 2018 || Everything Now || Polaris Music Prize || 
|-
| colspan="4" align="center" | Polaris Heritage Prize
|-
| align="center" | 2015 || Funeral || Polaris Heritage Prize (2000~2005) || 
|-
| align="center" | 2016 || Funeral || Polaris Heritage Prize (1996~2005) || 
|}

Prism Prize
The Prism Prize is a national juried award recognizing the artistry of the modern music video in Canada. Arcade Fire has won two awards from three nominations.

|-
| align="center" | 2013 || "Sprawl II (Mountains Beyond Mountains)" || Audience Award  || 
|-
| align="center" rowspan="2" | 2014 || "Afterlife" || Prism Prize  || 
|-
| "Reflektor" || Prism Prize  || 
|}

Q Awards
The Q Awards are the United Kingdom annual music awards run by the music magazine Q. Arcade Fire has been nominated for nine awards.

|-
| align="center" rowspan="2" | 2007 || Neon Bible || Best Album || 
|-
| Arcade Fire || Best Live Act || 
|-
| align="center" rowspan="3" | 2010 || The Suburbs || Best Album || 
|-
| "We Used to Wait" || Best Video || 
|-
| Arcade Fire || Best Act in the World || 
|-
| align="center" rowspan="2" | 2011 || rowspan="2" | Arcade Fire || Best Act in the World || 
|-
| Greatest Act of the Last 25 Years || 
|-
| align="center" rowspan="2" | 2014 || rowspan="2" | Arcade Fire || Best Act in the World || 
|-
| Best Live Act || 
|}

Shortlist Music Prize
The Shortlist Music Prize was an annual music award for the best album released in the United States that had sold fewer than 500,000 copies at the time of nomination. Arcade Fire was nominated for two awards.

|-
| align="center" | 2005 || Funeral || Shortlist Music Prize || 
|-
| align="center" | 2007 || Neon Bible || Shortlist Music Prize || 
|}

Silver Clef Award
The Silver Clef Award is an annual United Kingdom music awards lunch which has been running since 1976.

|-
| align="center" | 2011 || Arcade Fire || Ambassadors of Rock Award || 
|}

SOCAN Songwriting Prize
The SOCAN Songwriting Prize (Society of Composers, Authors and Music Publishers of Canada) is an annual competition recognizing the best in Canadian emerging music, both anglophone and francophone.

|-
| 2011 || "We Used to Wait" || Anglophone Songwriting Prize || 
|}

Other

|-
| 2004 || Stereogum || Band to Watch || 
|-
| 2005 || ASCAP || Vanguard Award || 
|-
| 2010 || Best Art Vinyl || The Suburbs || 
|-
| 2013 || Consequence of Sound || Band of the Year || 
|}

References

External links
 Official website

Awards
Lists of awards received by Canadian musician
Lists of awards received by musical group